Athgo International is a political, non-profit organization that seeks to bring together people from ages 18 to 32 to take action in one of three focus areas: Information and Communication Technologies (ICTs) and High Tech, Environment and Energy, and Governance. Athgo was established in 1999 as an acronym for "Alliance Toward Harnessing Global Opportunities." In April 2008, the organization dropped the acronym, and became known simply as Athgo.

Focus Areas 
The ICTs and High Tech focus area emphasizes that a rigorous academic syllabus is a prerequisite for technological advancements in the world’s developing economies.  Past events that focused on this area are: “Bridging the Development Gap: Sustainable Growth in Information and Communication Technologies and Hi-tech through Education ” and “Information and Communication Technologies: Opportunities and Challenges in Landlocked Developing Countries,” both of which were held at the American University of Armenia. The 2007 Global Leadership and Innovation Summit, on the other hand, was held in Geneva, Switzerland. 

Environment and Energy focus area is aimed at promoting environmental awareness and encouraging participants to consider alternative forms of energy. In the past, two events that are related to this area of focus have been held. The first: “Global Warming: Change Your Attitude! Not the Weather,” was hosted by the University of California, Los Angeles, CA; while “Global Third Way: Becoming One with the Environment” was held at the United Nations Headquarters in New York, NY

Scholar Network 
Apart from the three focus areas covered by Athgo, the organization also encourages its outstanding alumni to keep close contact, by joining a distinguished group of people in the Scholar Network. 

Meanwhile, in order to be recognized as an alumnus/a of Athgo, participants in any event of the three focus areas will have to complete a written assignment that relates to theme of the event attended. Momentarily, Athgo selects the top ten participants based on the quality of his/her peer evaluations, group participation, and writing sample. 

Thenceforth, scholarship winners are invited to join other distinguished alumni and associates of Athgo at the Scholar Network, a distinction that prequalifies its holder to attend the most valued convention organized by Athgo, The Global Leadership and Innovation Summit. More so, members of the Scholar Network are provided with full funding to work at the Innovation and Capacity Building Centers, a state-of-the-art research facility that is suitable for conducting research on entrepreneurship, and developing actable public policies.

Affiliations 
Athgo draws its support from international bodies, academia, private organizations, businesses, and its alumni. Below is a compacted list of some of the organizations that ATHGO has partnered with and/or have received funding from. 

International Bodies

 World Bank Group
 World Intellectual Property Organization
 UN Global Compact
 UN’s Global Alliance for ICT and Development (GAID)
 UN Permanent Missions and Embassies

Academia

 American University of Armenia
 Boston College
 Centre of International Studies, Cambridge, UK
 Columbia University
 Concordia University, Canada
 Cornell University
 Georgetown University
 Johns Hopkins University
 London School of Economics, UK
 McGill University, Canada
 Royal Military College of Canada
 Seton Hall University
 Stanford University
 Sydney University, Australia
 Tambov Technical University, Russia
 United Nations University
 University of California, Los Angeles
 University of Bergamo, Italy
 University of Bradford, UK
 University of California, Berkeley
 University of Edinburgh, UK
 University of Genoa, Italy
 University of Ljubljana, Slovenia
 University of Southern California
 University of Vienna, Austria
 University of Waterloo, Canada
 University of York, UK
 United States Naval Academy, Maryland
 Yerevan State University, Armenia

Private Organizations

 Campus Climate Challenge
 The Climate Project
 Development Gateway Foundation
 Mertz Gilmore Foundation

Businesses

 AECOM
 British Petroleum (BP)
 Clean Development Mechanism (CDM)
 Electronics Recycler
 MWH
 Nestlé USA
 Northrop Grumman Corporation
 VivaCell
 Waste Management
 Fortune 500
 Enterprise Incubator Foundation

References 

Organizations based in California